Sandaraca or Sandarake was a coastal town of ancient Bithynia, at a distance of 90 stadia to the east of the river Oxines.

Its site is located near Zonguldak in Asiatic Turkey.

References

Populated places in Bithynia
Former populated places in Turkey
History of Zonguldak Province